
The following is a list of notable call centre companies:
 Atento
 Concentrix
 Conduent
 Contact Centre Cymru
 Convergys Corporation
 Datacom Group
 DialAmerica
 Firstsource
 Focus Services
 Genpact
 Hinduja Global Solutions
 InfoCision Management Corporation
 Inktel Direct
 iQor
 Minacs
 NCO Group
 One World Direct
 Qualfon
 Sitel
 Sykes Enterprises
 SupportSave
 Tech Mahindra
 Teleperformance
 TeleTech
 Televerde
 TELUS International
 Transcom WorldWide
 United Nearshore Operations
 WNS Global Services
 Webhelp
 Wipro Ltd
 Whistl

Telephony
Call centre companies
Telemarketing
Outsourcing companies